Keaveney is an Irish surname, which is an anglicized form of the Gaelic Ó Géibheannaigh, meaning "descendant of Géibheannach". Géibheannach means "fettered". Alternative spellings include Keaveny, Keveney, Keavney, and Kiveney. Related names include Caveney, Kaney, Kevan, Kevany, Kenney, Kenny, Geaveny, Geany, Guiney and O'Guiney.

Background
The O Geibheannaigh sept came from County Galway. A sept or clan was a collective term describing a group of persons whose immediate ancestors bore a common surname and inhabited the same territory. This was a sept of the Uí Mháine (or "Hymany") descended from Geibhennach, son of Aedh, Chief of the Uí Mháine. Geibhennach was slain in battle in 971 at Keshcorran, County Sligo. 

The Uí Mháine chieftains ruled much of East Galway and South Roscommon. The Irish language meaning of Géibheannach is  "hostage" or "captive" probably indicating that Aedh's son had been taken hostage by enemies at an earlier stage.

People
Anna Keaveney (1949–2004), British actress
Arthur Keaveney (1951–2020), Irish historian
Cecilia Keaveney (born 1968), Irish politician
Colm Keaveney (born 1971), Irish politician
Jimmy Keaveney (born 1945), Irish football player
Joseph Keaveny (born 1955), American politician 
Paddy Keaveney (1929–1995), Irish politician 
Shaun Keaveny (born 1972), British broadcaster

References

Surnames of Irish origin
Anglicised Irish-language surnames
Irish clans